Gideon Alfred Rodan (June 14, 1934 – January 1, 2006) was a Romanian-born American biochemist and Doctor of Medicine.

Rodan was born in Bucharest, Romania. He completed an MD at the Hebrew University in Jerusalem and a PhD at the Weizmann Institute of Science in Rehovot, Israel.

He researched the deformation of bone cells. His most notable work was about Osteoporosis. Rodan researched the connection between osteoblasts and osteoclasts and helped to analyse and describe the two. In the 1990s, Rodan, now director of the department for bone biology and osteoporosis at the Merck Research Laboratories, helped to create a compound to block osteoclast-mediated bone resorption. This compound became known as Alendronate or Fosamax. In further works he examined the role of steroid in bone metabolism and the communication between bones and hormones.

From 1970 to 1985, Gideon Rodan taught at the University of Connecticut School of Dental Medicine until he switched over to Merck. In 1987, Rodan became president of the American Society for Bone and Mineral Research. He was the editor of the book Principles of Bone Biology (1996).

The American Society for Bone and Mineral Research has given the Gideon A. Rodan Excellence in Mentorship Award every year since 2001.  Rodan was the first recipient of the award, later named in his honor.

Gideon Rodan died of cancer on January 1, 2006 in Bryn Mawr, Pennsylvania.

References

1934 births
2006 deaths
Physicians from Bucharest
Romanian emigrants to the United States
Deaths from cancer in Pennsylvania
American biochemists
Hebrew University of Jerusalem alumni
Weizmann Institute of Science alumni